Northwest Passage, also billed as Northwest Passage (Book 1: Roger's Rangers), is a 1940 American Western film in Technicolor, directed by King Vidor. It stars Spencer Tracy, Robert Young, Walter Brennan and Ruth Hussey. The film is set in 1759, and tells a partly fictionalized version of the real-life St. Francis Raid by Rogers' Rangers, led by Robert Rogers (played by Tracy) on the primarily Abenaki village of St. Francis, in modern-day Canada. The screenplay, by Laurence Stallings and Talbot Jennings, is based on the 1937 historical novel Northwest Passage by Kenneth Roberts.

Roberts' novel is split into two parts, referred to as "Book 1" and "Book 2", and the film is based entirely on Book 1. There was originally discussion about filming a sequel that would cover Book 2, but this did not happen. Ironically, Rogers' quest to find a Northwest Passage through North America, which gave both the novel and the film their title, takes place in Book 2, and is only briefly mentioned in the film.

Plot
In 1759, Langdon Towne (Robert Young), son of a ropemaker and ship rigger, returns to Portsmouth, New Hampshire after his expulsion from Harvard University. Though disappointed, his family greets him with love, as does Elizabeth Browne (Ruth Hussey). Elizabeth's father (Louis Hector), a noted clergyman, is less welcoming and denigrates Langdon's aspirations to become a painter.

At the local tavern with friend Sam Livermore (Lester Matthews), Langdon disparages Wiseman Clagett (Montagu Love), the king's attorney and the Native American agent Sir William Johnson, unaware that Clagett is in the next room with another official. Facing arrest, Langdon fights the two men with the help of "Hunk" Marriner (Walter Brennan), a local woodsman and both escape into the countryside.

Fleeing westward, Langdon and Marriner stop in a backwoods tavern, where they help a man in a green uniform. After a night of drinking "Flip" - similar to hot buttered rum - the two men wake up at Fort Crown Point, where they learn the man they met is Major Robert Rogers (Spencer Tracy), commander of Rogers' Rangers. In need of Langdon's map-making skills, Rogers recruits the two men for his latest expedition to destroy the hostile Abenakis tribe and their town of St. Francis far to the north.

Rogers' force rows north in whale boats on Lake Champlain by night, evading French patrols, but several soldiers are injured in a confrontation with Mohawk scouts. Rogers sends not only the wounded back to Crown Point, but also the disloyal Mohawks provided by Sir William Johnson (Frederick Worlock) and a number of men who disobeyed orders. Concealing their boats, the depleted force marches through swampland to conceal their movements. Informed by Stockbridge Indian scouts that the French have captured their boats and extra supplies, Rogers revises his plan and sends an injured officer back to Fort Crown Point requesting the British send supplies to old Fort Wentworth, to be met by the returning rangers.

Making a human chain to cross a river, the rangers reach St. Francis. Their attack succeeds, and they set fire to the dwellings and cut the Abenakis off from retreat. After the battle, the rangers find only a few baskets of parched corn to replenish their provisions. Marriner finds Langdon shot in his abdomen. The rangers set out for Wentworth, pursued by hostile French and Indian forces. Their initial objective is Lake Memphremagog, with the injured Langdon bringing up the rear.

Ten days later, Rogers' men reach the hills above Lake Memphremagog. Encountering signs of French activity, Rogers prefers to press on a hundred miles to Fort Wentworth, but the men vote to split up into four parties to hunt for food. Game proves scarce and two of the detachments are ambushed by the French, leaving most of the men dead. Persevering through harsh conditions, Rogers and the remaining fifty men finally reach the fort, only to find it unoccupied and in disrepair, and the British relief column has not arrived. Though personally despairing, Rogers attempts to perk up their flagging spirits with a prayer. They then hear the fifes and drums of approaching British boats with the supplies. Reporting that the Abenakis have been destroyed, the British honour Rogers’ men by presenting their firearms and shouting "Huzzah".

Returning to Portsmouth, Langdon reunites with Elizabeth while the Rangers are given a new mission: to find the Northwest Passage. Rogers fires them up with a speech about the wonders they will see on the march to the first point of embarkation, a little fort called "Detroit." He passes by Langdon and Elizabeth to say goodbye; Elizabeth informs him that she and Langdon are headed for London where she is hopeful Langdon will become a great painter. Rogers bids them farewell and marches down the road and off into the sunset.

Cast
 Spencer Tracy as Major Rogers
 Robert Young as Langdon Towne
 Walter Brennan as "Hunk" Marriner
 Ruth Hussey as Elizabeth Browne
 Nat Pendleton as "Cap" Huff
 Louis Hector as Reverend Browne
 Robert Barrat as Humphrey Towne
 Lumsden Hare as Lord Amherst
 Donald MacBride as Sergeant McNott
 Isabel Jewell as Jennie Coit
 Douglas Walton as Lieutenant Avery
 Addison Richards as Lieutenant Crofton
 Hugh Sothern as Jesse Beacham
 Regis Toomey as Webster
 Montagu Love as Wiseman Clagett
 Lester Matthews as Sam Livermore
 Truman Bradley as Captain Ogden
 Tom London as Ranger (uncredited)

Production

Development
The film is set in the mid-18th century during the French and Indian War (as the Seven Years' War in North America is usually known in the US). It is a partly fictionalized account of the St. Francis Raid, an attack by Rogers' Rangers on Saint Francis (the current Odanak, Quebec), a settlement of the Abenakis, an American Indian tribe. The purpose of the raid was to avenge the many attacks on British settlers and deter any further ones.

The title is something of a misnomer, since this film is a truncated version of the original story, and only at the end do we find that Rogers and his men are about to go on a search for the Northwest Passage.

Filming
The film was shot in central Idaho, near Payette Lake and the city of McCall.

The film wound up as MGM's most expensive film since Ben Hur (1926). The picture was originally slated for an even more lavish budget in an earlier incarnation and was to star Wallace Beery and Tracy but management difficulties between Irving Thalberg and Louis B. Mayer interceded at that time.

Reception

Box office
According to MGM records the film earned $2,169,000 in the US and Canada and $981,000 elsewhere but because of its high cost incurred a loss of $885,000.

Awards and honors
The film was nominated for an Oscar for Best Cinematography (Color) in 1941, but lost out to The Thief of Bagdad.

Sequels and related projects
According to one source, the script was revised by as many as 12 other writers, in addition to the two credited.  Author Kenneth Roberts served as a co-writer on a second draft of a proposed script for the movie, one that covered the entire novel, not just the first book of it. However, executives at MGM scuttled the revision and instead used the first draft of the script, which covered only the first book, as the basis for the finished film. This is why the film Northwest Passage was subtitled Book One: Roger's Rangers.

Director King Vidor then attempted to make a sequel to the film in which Rogers' Rangers find the Northwest Passage, although Roberts refused to cooperate with the project. But filming never began, because MGM ultimately refused to green-light it.

MGM produced a 1958-1959 American television series Northwest Passage starring Keith Larsen as Robert Rogers, with Buddy Ebsen costarring as "Hunk" Marriner, replacing Walter Brennan, who had his own TV series, The Real McCoys, in production at the time. The show aired on NBC.

Legacy

Depiction of American Indians
The film's depiction of American Indians came to be criticized as racist, even by the standards of Hollywood at the time. This appraisal mirrors that of the section of the novel set during the French and Indian War, which has become equally regarded as racist.

Clive Denton, in his 1976 book The Hollywood Professionals: Volume 5, made these observations on the subject:

Later screenings
The film was shown at the 70th Berlin International Film Festival in February 2020, as part of a retrospective dedicated to King Vidor's career.

Footnotes

References
Denton, Clive. 1976. The Hollywood Professionals, Volume 5: King Vidor, John Cromwell, Mervyn LeRoy. The Tanvity Press, London.

External links 
 
 
 
 
 

1940 films
1940s historical adventure films
1940 Western (genre) films
American historical adventure films
American Western (genre) films
1940s English-language films
Films based on American novels
Films based on historical novels
Films based on military novels
Films shot in Idaho
Films directed by King Vidor
French and Indian War films
Metro-Goldwyn-Mayer films
Films set in 1759
Films set in New Hampshire
Films set in New York (state)
Films set in Quebec
Films set in the Thirteen Colonies
Films scored by Herbert Stothart
1940s American films